The 2019–20 Air Force Falcons men's basketball team represented the United States Air Force Academy during the 2019–20 NCAA Division I men's basketball season. The Falcons, led by eighth-year head coach Dave Pilipovich, played their home games at the Clune Arena on the Air Force Academy's main campus in Colorado Springs, Colorado as members of the Mountain West Conference. They finished the season 12–20, 5–13 in Mountain West play to finish in ninth place. They defeated Fresno State in the first round of the Mountain West tournament before losing in the quarterfinals to San Diego State.

On March 9, 2020, head coach Dave Pilipovich was fired. He finished at Air Force with an eight-year record of 110–151.

Previous season 
The Falcons finished the season 14–18, 8–10 in Mountain West play to finish in sixth place. They defeated San Jose State in the first round of the Mountain West tournament before losing in the quarterfinals to Fresno State.

Offseason

Departures

2019 recruiting class

2020 recruiting class

Roster

Schedule and results 
Source

|-
!colspan=9 style=| Exhibition

|-
!colspan=9 style=| Regular season

|-
!colspan=9 style=| Mountain West tournament

References 

Air Force
Air Force Falcons men's basketball seasons
Air Force Falcons
Air Force Falcons